This is a list of notable individuals born in Monaco of Lebanese ancestry or people of Lebanese or Monegasque  nationality who live or lived in the principality.

Business
 Bahaa Hariri - businessman

Musicians
 Bob Azzam - singer

See also
Lebanese people in France
List of Lebanese people
List of Lebanese people in France
List of Lebanese people (Diaspora)

Monaco

Lebanese
Lebanese